Danny McManus (was born June 17, 1965) is a former professional American football and Canadian football quarterback who passed for over 53,000 yards in seventeen seasons in the Canadian Football League and currently serves as the Assistant General Manager and Director for US Scouting for the Winnipeg Blue Bombers. He played every season in the league from 1990 to 2006, as a member of the Winnipeg Blue Bombers, BC Lions, Edmonton Eskimos, Hamilton Tiger-Cats, and finally with the Calgary Stampeders. As of 2007, his all-time CFL passing yardage is third most next to Damon Allen and Anthony Calvillo, and he works as a colour analyst for TSN's CFL broadcasts, having previously appeared as a guest analyst on the CFL on CBC late in his playing career. On December 2, 2013, he was named the Assistant General Manager and Director of U.S. Scouting for the Winnipeg Blue Bombers. Previous to that, he served as the director of scouting for the Hamilton Tiger-Cats.

College career
McManus spent four seasons at Florida State University, from 1984 to 1987, coached by Bobby Bowden (McManus also went to Florida State in 1983, but was redshirted). McManus was named the starter as quarterback in 1985 and led the Seminoles to defeat Nebraska.  After four victories, he suffered a pair of concussions and he spent the rest of 1985 on the bench.  But in 1986, McManus was named the Seminole's offensive most valuable player, after a season that saw him come out of the backup position to end the year as the starter, throwing for 872 yards and seven touchdowns.

In 1987, he started every game for Florida State, leading them to an 11–1 record and a spot in the Fiesta Bowl, which they won 31–28 over the University of Nebraska.  Due to his leadership, FSU had one of their greatest campaigns.  McManus, who threw for 375 yards and three touchdowns in the bowl game, was named the most valuable player, and wound up with 1,984 yards and fourteen touchdowns on the year. After this season, McManus was selected in the 1988 NFL Draft in the eleventh round by the Kansas City Chiefs.

Professional career

National Football League
McManus made the Chiefs out of training camp, and spent his first, and only, National Football League season on the bench as the third quarterback. McManus saw no action and was released during 1989's training camp. He spent all of 1989 trying to catch on with another NFL team but was unsuccessful.

Winnipeg Blue Bombers
Unable to find a place to play in 1989, McManus signed with the Canadian Football League's Winnipeg Blue Bombers in time for the 1990 season. The Blue Bombers of the era were in the middle of a mini-dynasty, where they won two Grey Cups in three years. The 1990 season gave the Blue Bombers perhaps their best ending ever, as they obliterated the Edmonton Eskimos 50–11 in the 78th Grey Cup in Vancouver. McManus, the Blue Bombers' backup all year, threw for a total of 946 yards and seven touchdowns during the season, and also tossed a touchdown in the Grey Cup in a rare appearance for the backup in the championship game.

Through 1991 and 1992, McManus remained with the Blue Bombers as the backup quarterback to Matt Dunigan. He made his second Grey Cup appearance in 1992, again coming in for a relief stint. This time, however, the circumstances were not so good, as Dunigan had been ineffective and the Blue Bombers went on to lose the 80th Grey Cup 24–10 to Calgary at SkyDome in Toronto, Ontario.

BC Lions
After the Grey Cup, he left Winnipeg as a free agent and ended up signing with the BC Lions, and started three games in 1993 when starting quarterback Danny Barrett was injured. For 1994, McManus was again the backup, this time to Kent Austin. However, fate would give him a larger role in this season as, in the West Final he replaced Austin and led the Lions to a trip to a comeback victory over the Calgary Stampeders in a driving snowstorm culminating in a last second TD pass that sent the Lions to the Grey Cup Game at home in Vancouver. In the 82nd Grey Cup, Austin was knocked out of the game and McManus had to take over at halftime, and ended up leading the Lions on a dramatic drive downfield setting up Lui Passaglia to kick a game-winning field goal, giving BC a 26–23 victory over the Baltimore Stallions. It was McManus's second Grey Cup and third appearance in five years in the Canadian Football League.

In 1995, McManus was given the reins as the Lions' full-time starter. McManus threw for 4,655 yards (second in the league behind his old mentor Dunigan) and 19 touchdowns. But the Lions' efforts to defend their Grey Cup were quickly derailed come playoff time, as the Lions were defeated by the Edmonton Eskimos in the Western Division Semi-Final despite McManus throwing for 333 yards and two touchdowns.

Edmonton Eskimos
Any animosity McManus must have felt to the Eskimos must have quickly cooled, however, as he signed with Edmonton during the off-season as a free agent following his release by British Columbia. Once again, he was second in the league in passing yardage for 1996, this time behind Doug Flutie, with 4,425 yards, 22 touchdowns, and 19 interceptions. He led the Eskimos to second in the Western Division and the Grey Cup game, including a 68–7 slaughtering of McManus's old Blue Bombers in the Western Semi-Final. In the driving snow at Ivor Wynne Stadium, the Toronto Argonauts defeated Edmonton in the 84th Grey Cup 43–37. He had an excellent game despite the conditions with 413 yards and three touchdowns, but was outplayed by Toronto's Flutie, who was named the most outstanding player. McManus's only interception of the game came when Doug Flutie's brother Darren fell trying to catch a well-thrown ball, and the ball ricocheted off of Flutie and into the waiting arms of a Toronto defensive back, who returned it for a touchdown.

1997 was a slight regression for him, but not for the Eskimos as they won their division for the first time since 1991. McManus fell to fourth in passing yardage but was still the Edmonton nominee for Most Outstanding Player. Edmonton was hosting the 85th Grey Cup that year and hopes were high that the Eskimos would play at it, but Edmonton lost a heart-breaking Western final to the Saskatchewan Roughriders 31–30. McManus threw for an excellent 407 yards in the game in a losing effort.

Hamilton Tiger-Cats
McManus left the Eskimos as a free agent for 1998, as the Hamilton Tiger-Cats signed both the veteran quarterback and his all-time favorite receiver, Darren Flutie. McManus arrived on a talent-laden team and did not disappoint, finishing second in passing yardage for the second time in his career and becoming only the second Hamilton quarterback to pass for over 4,000 yards in a season. The Tiger-Cats warred with the fast-rising Montreal Alouettes and their veteran quarterback Anthony Calvillo all season, including a rare tie in a regular-season meeting between the two teams. Hamilton and Montreal finished even at 12–5–1, but Hamilton took first place on their superior head-to-head record. When the two teams inevitably clashed in the East final, Hamilton took a thriller 22–20. However, all-star quarterback Jeff Garcia and his Calgary Stampeders beat Hamilton 26–24 in the 86th Grey Cup.

Despite the disappointment of 1998, McManus rebounded in superb fashion for 1999. Throwing for 5,334 yards and 28 touchdowns, McManus won his first, and only, Most Outstanding Player award. The icing on the cake came on the 87th Grey Cup, where McManus thwarted the Stampeders' drive for a repeat in a rematch of the previous year's championship game. Garcia was gone to the NFL but his replacement Dave Dickenson had proven very dangerous; however, the Tiger-Cats took their first Grey Cup since 1986 with a 32–21 victory. It was McManus's third Grey Cup and his sixth appearance in the big game.

In 2000, McManus set the CFL record with six straight seasons throwing for at least 4,000 yards. But, after their Grey Cup victory, the Tiger-Cats were beginning to enter a long spiral to the East Division basement. The team finished a disappointing 9–9 and lost the East Semi-Final to Winnipeg. 2001 was a slight resurgence as the Tiger-Cats finished 11–7, but another loss to Winnipeg in the East Final sent the Tiger-Cats home early. By 2002, the Tiger-Cats were running on fumes and went down to 7–11, ahead of only the expansion Ottawa Renegades. For the first time in his CFL career, Danny McManus missed the playoffs.

McManus turned 38 during the 2003 CFL season, and the retirement talk was coming in hard. It would be hard for it not to, however, as the Tiger-Cats were one of the worst teams in Canadian football history that year. Despite starting fifteen games, McManus threw for only 2,869 yards, snapping his record streak of consecutive 4,000-yard seasons at eight. McManus might have been hurt by the loss of preferred target Darren Flutie to retirement. The Tiger-Cats finished 1–17, with the only bright spot being an overtime victory over the Saskatchewan Roughriders.

2004 was significantly stronger for McManus, as was his team. For the second time in his career, McManus threw for over 5,000 yards despite turning 39 early in the season. The Tiger-Cats shocked the Canadian football world by finishing 9–8–1, an accomplishment amazing enough for rookie head coach Greg Marshall to be named coach of the year and McManus to receive the Rogers-AT&T Fan Choice Award, sharing it with Anthony Calvillo. In Hamilton's sole playoff game, they lost the East Semi-Final to rivals Toronto 24–6.

The Tiger-Cats were unable to build on their 2004 success, and in the 2005 season finished in the league's basement at 5–13, with a defense that allowed 583 points. McManus threw for 2,544 yards and eleven touchdowns with a quarterback rating of 67.1, and spent time on the bench in favor of Khari Jones, Marcus Brady, and the unknown Kevin Eakin who all took snaps.

Final season and retirement
After the 93rd Grey Cup, McManus was traded to the newly crowned league champion Edmonton Eskimos in a package that included as the centerpiece Edmonton quarterback Jason Maas.  This was the first time McManus had ever been traded in his career and his second go-round with Edmonton. On March 31, 2006, McManus was traded for the second time in his career, this time to the Calgary Stampeders. Edmonton received a third round draft pick in the 2006 CFL Draft in return. For the 2006 season, he served as backup and mentor to Stampeders' starting quarterback Henry Burris. He announced his retirement from playing football on April 2, 2007. He was quickly snapped up by TSN as an analyst for CFL game broadcasts for the 2007 season. He was inducted into the Canadian Football Hall of Fame in 2011.

Coaching career
McManus began working as a guest coach with the Tiger-Cats during 2008 CFL season training camp and signed on as a coaching consultant in July to assist offensive co-ordinator Marcel Bellefeuille and work with the quarterbacks. Danny was also formerly the head U.S. scout for the Ti-Cats.

Front office career
On December 2, 2013, it was announced by TSN that Danny McManus has been hired as the Assistant General Manager and Director of U.S. Scouting for the Winnipeg Blue Bombers. He was hired by his former Ti-Cat's teammate, Kyle Walters, who is now serving as Winnipeg Blue Bomber's General Manager.

Legacy

In 2012 and in honor of the 100th Grey Cup, Canada Post used his image on a series of commemorative postage stamps. The image was also used on presentation posters and other materials to promote the Grey Cup game and other celebrations associated with the centennial.

See also
 List of gridiron football quarterbacks passing statistics

References

1965 births
Living people
American football quarterbacks
BC Lions players
Calgary Stampeders players
Canadian Football Hall of Fame inductees
Canadian Football League announcers
Canadian Football League Most Outstanding Player Award winners
Canadian football quarterbacks
Canadian television sportscasters
Edmonton Elks players
Florida State Seminoles football players
Hamilton Tiger-Cats players
Kansas City Chiefs players
People from Dania Beach, Florida
Players of American football from Florida
McManus, Danny
Sportspeople from Broward County, Florida
Winnipeg Blue Bombers players
Hamilton Tiger-Cats coaches
Hamilton Tiger-Cats personnel
Winnipeg Blue Bombers personnel